There are a number of notational systems for the Jacobi theta functions. The notations given in the Wikipedia article define the original function

which is equivalent to

However, a similar notation is defined somewhat differently in Whittaker and Watson, p. 487:

This notation is attributed to "Hermite, H.J.S. Smith and some other mathematicians". They also define

These definitions can be made at least proportional by x = za, but other definitions cannot. Whittaker and Watson, Abramowitz and Stegun, and Gradshteyn and Ryzhik all follow Tannery and Molk, in which

Note that there is no factor of π in the argument as in the previous definitions.

The warning in Abramowitz and Stegun, "There is a bewildering variety of notations...in consulting books caution should be exercised," may be viewed as an understatement. In any expression, an occurrence of  should not be assumed to have any particular definition.

References
 
 
 E. T. Whittaker and G. N. Watson, A Course in Modern Analysis, fourth edition, Cambridge University Press, 1927. (See chapter XXI for the history of Jacobi's θ functions)

Theta functions
Elliptic functions